The Basketball Tournament at the 1995 Pan American Games was held in Mar del Plata, Argentina from March 19 to March 25, 1995. The women's tournament was cancelled because as of March 3, 1995, only four women's teams had signed up to play.

All the games were held in Polideportivo Islas Malvinas, which was built for this edition of the Pan American Games. Argentina won their first Pan American Games after beating United States in the final. Argentina, coached by Guillermo Vecchio, finished the tournament unbeaten.

Men's tournament

Preliminary round

 March 19, 1995

 March 20, 1995

 March 21, 1995

 March 22, 1995

 March 23, 1995

Knockout stages

 March 24, 1995 – 5th/6th place

 March 24, 1995 – Semi-Finals

 March 25, 1995 – Bronze Medal Match

Gold Medal match

Final standings

Awards

References

Basketball
1999
1995–96 in North American basketball
1995–96 in South American basketball
International basketball competitions hosted by Argentina